Rick Benjamin may refer to:
Rick Benjamin (announcer) (born 1952), motor racing announcer
Rick Benjamin (conductor), director and founder of The Paragon Ragtime Orchestra
Rick Benjamin (trombonist), trombonist and contributor to numerous Elephant 6 Recording Co. albums
Rick Benjamin (writer), American poet from Rhode Island

See also
Richard Benjamin (born 1938), American actor and film director